Lostock Lane railway station served the Lostock area of Greater Manchester, England. It was located in a rural setting where Lostock Lane crossed the line. During industrialisation, nearby Horwich, Blackrod, and Lostock all grew rapidly, leaving Lostock Lane station with little source of traffic.

The station was situated immediately west of the bridge carrying Lostock Lane.  By 2015 no trace of the station could be seen, though the flattened station site remains railway property with good access for road vehicles. The double tracks through the site are well used and have been electrified.

Since closure of Lostock Lane, Lostock Junction has been renamed Lostock and a new station has been opened between Lostock Lane and Blackrod called Horwich Parkway.

References

Sources

External links
The station on an 1849-50 OS Map via old OS maps
The station site on a 1948 OS Map via npe maps

Disused railway stations in the Metropolitan Borough of Bolton
Former Lancashire and Yorkshire Railway stations
Railway stations in Great Britain opened in 1846
Railway stations in Great Britain closed in 1879
1846 establishments in England